Siheung County(Siheung-gun, 시흥군; 1895-1989) is a former country in Gyeonggi-do.
 Siheung City(Siheung-si, 시흥시; 1989-) is a city in Gyeonggi-do.
 Siheung-dong(시흥동), is an dong in Geumcheon-gu, Seoul.
 Siheung-dong, Seongnam is an dong in Sujeong-gu, Seongnam, Gyeonggi-do.